Cleighton Cornelius (born 2 June 1976) is a New Zealand cricketer. He played in three first-class and ten List A matches for Canterbury from 2001 to 2005.

See also
 List of Canterbury representative cricketers

References

External links
 

1976 births
Living people
New Zealand cricketers
Canterbury cricketers
Cricketers from Christchurch